Suckin' It for the Holidays is a comedy album by American stand-up comedian Kathy Griffin. It was recorded at Borgata Hotel in Atlantic City, New Jersey. It was released online shortly before the Grammy nominations cut-off, in her second attempt to win the award. Her first comedy album, For Your Consideration, received a Best Comedy Album nomination in 2008 but George Carlin posthumously won for It's Bad for Ya.

Despite its title, Suckin' It for the Holidays is not a holiday album, although Kwanzaa is mentioned briefly. Griffin addresses many of her favorite subjects, including the foibles of celebrities and people who appear on reality television.

Track listing

Chart performance
Though not as successful as her previous album, this one entered the Top Comedy Album at number four on its debut, making it another Top Ten album for Griffin on this chart.

Personnel

Technical and production
 Kathy Griffin - Executive producer; performer
 Christian Stavros
 Louie Tera
 Jacob Feinberg-Pyne

Visuals and imagery
 David Bett
 Michelle Holme

References

Kathy Griffin albums
Stand-up comedy albums
2009 live albums
Live comedy albums
Spoken word albums by American artists
Live spoken word albums